Agustín Ignacio Aleo (born 20 May 1998) is an Argentine professional footballer who plays as a left-back for Atlético Güemes.

Career
Aleo began in the ranks of Club Alemán, before moving onto Coquimbito Maipú and Godoy Cruz. Diego Dabove, for the latter, selected him on the substitutes bench for a 2017–18 Primera División fixture with Arsenal de Sarandí though never selected him, a scenario which was repeated three more times throughout 2018–19. He made his bow in professional football on 18 February 2019 against Racing Club, starting an away defeat at the Estadio Presidente Juan Domingo Perón.

In January 2020, Aleo joined Argentinos Juniors on loan with a purchase option until mid-January 2021. Aleo returned to Godoy Cruz in January 2021, but wasn't however a part of the plans. In the following month, Aleo joined Ferro Carril Oeste. At the end of January 2022, Aleao joined Atlético Güemes.

Career statistics
.

References

External links

1998 births
Living people
Sportspeople from Mendoza Province
Argentine footballers
Association football defenders
Argentine Primera División players
Godoy Cruz Antonio Tomba footballers
Argentinos Juniors footballers
Ferro Carril Oeste footballers